John Louis O'Sullivan (November 15, 1813 – March 24, 1895) was an American columnist, editor, and diplomat who used the term "manifest destiny" in 1845 to promote the annexation of Texas and the Oregon Country to the United States. O'Sullivan was an influential political writer and advocate for the Democratic Party at that time and served as U.S. minister to Portugal during the administration of President Franklin Pierce (1853–1857).

Early life and education
John Louis O'Sullivan, born on November 15, 1813, was the son of John Thomas O'Sullivan, an American diplomat and sea captain, and Mary Rowly, a genteel Englishwoman. According to legend, he was born at sea on a British warship off the coast of Gibraltar. O'Sullivan's father was a naturalized US citizen and had served as US Consul to the Barbary States.

O'Sullivan enrolled at Columbia College in New York at the age of 14. He graduated in 1831. In 1834, he received a Masters of Arts and became a lawyer.

Career 
In 1837, he founded and edited The United States Magazine and Democratic Review, based in Washington. It espoused the more radical forms of Jacksonian Democracy and the cause of a democratic, American literature. It published some of the most prominent American writers, including Nathaniel Hawthorne, Ralph Waldo Emerson, Henry David Thoreau, John Greenleaf Whittier, William Cullen Bryant, and Walt Whitman. O'Sullivan was an aggressive reformer in the New York State Legislature, where he led the unsuccessful movement to abolish capital punishment. By 1846, investors were dissatisfied with his poor management, and he lost control of his magazine.

O'Sullivan opposed the coming of the American Civil War, hoping that a peaceful solution, or a peaceful separation of North and South, could be resolved. In Europe when the war began, O'Sullivan became an active supporter of the Confederate States of America; he may have been on the Confederate payroll at some point. O'Sullivan wrote a number of pamphlets promoting the Confederate cause, arguing that the presidency had become too powerful and that states' rights needed to be protected against encroachment by the central government. Although he had earlier supported the "free soil" movement, he now defended the institution of slavery, writing that blacks and whites could not live together in harmony. His activities greatly disappointed some of his old friends, including Hawthorne. Towards the end of the Civil War, O'Sullivan appealed to his southern "comrades in arms" to burn Richmond, stating "let every man set fire to his own house".

See also

Young America Movement

References

Further reading
 Sampson, Robert D. "O'Sullivan, John Louis" American National Biography Online Feb. 2000. Access Oct 12 2015 
 Sampson, Robert D. John L. O'Sullivan and His Times. (Kent State University Press, 2003) online
 Scholnick, Robert J, "Extermination and Democracy: O'Sullivan, the Democratic Review, and Empire, 1837—1840." American Periodicals (2005) 15#2: 123–141.online
Widmer, Edward L. Young America: The Flowering of Democracy in New York City. New York: Oxford University Press, 1999. (excerpt)
Letters and Literary Memorials of Samuel J. Tilden – Volume 1 – Edited by John Bigelow

External links

"The Democratic Principle", mission statement from the first issue (1837) of the Democratic Review, called by Robert D. Sampson "a classic statement of romantic Jacksonian Democracy"
"The Great Nation of Futurity": November 1839 editorial in which O'Sullivan touched upon many themes of manifest destiny.
"Annexation": The July–August 1845 editorial in which the phrase "Manifest Destiny" first appeared

1813 births
1895 deaths
People born at sea
American columnists
American newspaper editors
Columbia College (New York) alumni
American people of Irish descent
Democratic Party members of the New York State Assembly
19th-century American diplomats
Deaths from influenza
19th-century American journalists
American male journalists
19th-century American male writers
19th-century American politicians
Naturalized citizens of the United States
Ambassadors of the United States to Portugal